DIN 43700, was the specification by the Deutsches Institut für Normung for  nominal front- and cut-out dimensions of measurement and control instruments for panel mounting. It has now been superseded by DIN IEC 61554:2002-08.

See also 
 list of DIN standards
 ISO 7736

43700